Government Nazrul College is a government college in Trishal Upazila, Mymensingh. It was established in 1967. It is an affiliated college of National University, Bangladesh.

History 
Government Nazrul College was established in 1967 and was named 'Nazrul College Trishal' as a memorial for the 'National Poet of Bangladesh', Kazi Nazrul Islam's appearance in Trishal. In 1970, the college was upgraded to graduation (degree) class and locally known as Nazrul College or Nazrul Degree College.
On August 12, 2018, the college was nationalised by the Ministry of Education (Bangladesh).

See More 
 Trishal Upazila
 Jatiya Kabi Kazi Nazrul Islam University

References

External links 
 

Colleges in Mymensingh District
Universities and colleges in Mymensingh District
Educational institutions established in 1967